Ellesmere Castle was in the town of Ellesmere, Shropshire..

This was a motte and bailey castle which was probably founded by Roger de Montgomerie, 1st Earl of Shrewsbury on a prominent hill to the east of the town, overlooking the Mere, soon after the Norman conquest.  It was given to the Peverel family by Henry I but taken back by Henry II who granted it to Dafydd ab Owain Gwynedd, Prince of Gwynedd, in about 1177.  It alternated between the English and Welsh crowns until the 1240s when it passed to the le Strange family whose origins were in Knockin, Shropshire.

The castle was destroyed in the English civil war.

Today the sides of the motte are clad with trees and its summit is occupied by a bowling green.

References
Notes

Sources
Ellesmere Castle in BBC site
Fry, Plantagenet Somerset, The David & Charles Book of Castles, David & Charles, 1980. 

Castles in Shropshire